George Brooksbank (born 1981) is a British business executive and former cricketer who played for Hertfordshire County Cricket Club. He is the founder and incumbent chief executive officer of Fairway Capital and Leconfield Property Group.

Early life and education
Born in 1981 in London, United Kingdom, Brookbank was educated at Cheltenham College. He is a graduate of the Cass Business School where he completed his master's degree in property valuation and law.

Career
Brooksbank started his career as a cricketer and played cricket for Hertfordshire. He played two matches for Hertfordshire in 2004. He was part of the Marylebone Cricket Club team which toured Argentina in 2008.

In 2010, Brooksbank founded Leconfield Property Group which is a residential development and construction company. It also specializes in property acquisitions.

In 2013, his company, Leconfield Property Group, purchased Margaret Thatcher's house in Belgravia. The company then refurbished the house and resold it for US$43.5 million in 2016.

In 2016, he founded an investment management firm, Fairway Capital.

In March 2020, his company, Fairway Capital, launched a new value-add residential fund. In July 2020, it raised GBP 80 million from various investors. In October 2020, fund received GBP 34.5 million from Investec for property acquisitions. It further raised funds from Catalyst Capital and Coutts & Co. in February 2021 The fund has bought ten properties in Belgravia and Knightsbridge for GBP 70 million.

References

External links
Market Moves: The resilience of prime residential

British businesspeople
Hertfordshire cricketers